Shah Amanat Bridge, the second constructed across the Karnaphuli River in Bangladesh, is the first major extradosed bridge in the country. It is located along the country's busiest national highway N1. It connects the southern parts of Chittagong, Cox's Bazar, and the hill district Bandarban. It is named after Chittagong's 18th-century Islamic Saint Shah Amanat.

Construction history
Construction of the bridge started in August, 2006 and it was officially opened on 8 September 2010. The Chinese construction company Major Bridge Construction, China, built the bridge. The project involved a cost of Taka 590 crore, including a foreign exchange component of Taka 3.72 billion provided by the Kuwait Fund.

Dimensions
The bridge is 950 m long and 24.47 m wide. It has five piers with three 200 m extradosed main spans, two 115 m side spans and a 130 m approach viaduct section. Alongside four lanes for vehicles, the bridge has two 1.5 m lanes for movement of 'manual transports' like rickshaws, push carts and vans. There is also a 1.5 m walkway on each side of the bridge. The bridge has a 0.5 km approach road in the city end and one km approach road at the Patiya end.

Gallery

References

External links

Design of the Third Karnaphuli Bridge at IABSE
Shah Amanat Bridge at Rendel Limited

Extradosed bridges
Extradosed bridges in Bangladesh
Road bridges in Bangladesh
Karnaphuli River
Buildings and structures in Chittagong
Bandarban District
Chittagong District
Cox's Bazar District